The 2022–23 Colorado State Rams men's basketball team represented Colorado State University during the 2022–23 NCAA Division I men's basketball season. The Rams were led by 5th-year head coach Niko Medved and played their home games for the 57th season at Moby Arena in Fort Collins, Colorado. They participate as members of the Mountain West Conference for the 24th season.

Previous season 
The Rams finished the 2021–22 season 25–6, 14–4 in Mountain West play to finish in 2nd place.

In the Mountain West tournament, the Rams received a first-round bye. They faced and defeated Utah State 53–51 in the quarterfinals before being eliminated by 3-seed San Diego State in a 58–63 loss.

The Rams were selected to the NCAA tournament for the first time since 2013 as the 6-seed in the South region. They were defeated by 11-seed Michigan in the first round 63–75 to end their season. For the first time in program history the team finished the season ranked in the AP Poll, at #24.

Offseason

Departures

Incoming transfers

2022 recruiting class

Roster

Schedule and results 

|-
!colspan=12 style=| Exhibition

|-
!colspan=12 style=| Non-conference regular season

|-
!colspan=12 style=| Mountain West regular season

 

  

  
  
 
|-
!colspan=12 style=| Mountain West tournament

Source

References 

Colorado State
Colorado State Rams men's basketball seasons
Run
Run